Shlomi Harush (born November 3, 1987) is an Israeli professional basketball player for Hapoel Holon of the Israeli Premier League.

Early years
Harush was born in Kfar Saba, Israel. He played for the Hapoel Kfar Saba youth team.

Professional career
On July 26, 2011, Harush signed a three-year deal with Hapoel Holon. On his first month with the club, Harush won the Young Player of the Month award for his performance on October '11.

On July 22, 2015, Harush signed with Hapoel Eilat for the 2015–2016. However, In January 2016, Harush parted ways with Eilat and returned to Hapoel Holon for the remainder of the season.

On July 13, 2016, Harush signed a three-year contract extension with Hapoel Holon. During the 2016–17 season, he was selected to the Israeli League All-Star game.

Israeli national team
Harush was a member of the Israeli Under-21 national team at the 2011 Summer Universiade.

References

External links
 RealGM.com profile
 Basket.co.il profile

1987 births
Living people
Hapoel Eilat basketball players
Hapoel Holon players
Hapoel Kfar Saba B.C. players
Israeli men's basketball players
Shooting guards
People from Kfar Saba